Trimorphodon is a genus of mildly venomous, rear-fanged, colubrid snakes. They are commonly known as lyre snakes, named after the distinctive V shaped pattern on their head that is said to resemble the shape of a lyre. In Mexico, they are commonly called "víbora de uña," or "nail viper."  The word Trimorphodon is a combination of three Greek words, 'tri' - three, 'morph' - shape, and 'odon' - teeth, which refers to the three distinct kinds of teeth that lyre snakes have: recurved anterior teeth; shorter middle teeth, and large grooved fangs at the rear of the jaw. There are two distinct species in the genus Trimorphodon, with seven subspecies.

Range 
Trimorphodon biscutatus ranges throughout the southwestern United States, from Texas to California as well as into northern Mexico. Trimorphodon tau ranges through most of Mexico, and down into Central America, in Guatemala, El Salvador, Honduras, Nicaragua, and as far south as Costa Rica. They are primarily found in rocky crevices and outcroppings.

Description 
Lyre snakes usually grow to about 1m at adult size. They have a broad head with a narrow neck and large eyes with vertical pupils. They are tan or brown in color, with distinctive black or dark brown bands that have lighter colored borders.

Behavior 
Trimorphodon species are primarily nocturnal, and feed on lizards, rodents and even bats. They are a very secretive species, and excellent climbers. They live inside rock crevices and canyon walls where humans cannot easily find them, which makes research difficult.

Reproduction 
They are oviparous, laying clutches of 10 or more eggs. Hybridization between species is not unknown in the areas where their range overlaps.

Speed 
There is no information on this category.

Venom 
Their venom is not considered to be dangerous to humans.

Species 
Western lyre snake, Trimorphodon biscutatus (Duméril, Bibron & Duméril, 1854)
Sonoran lyre snake, Trimorphodon lambda (Cope, 1886)
Baja California lyre snake, Trimorphodon lyrophanes (Cope, 1860)
Sinaloan lyre snake, Trimorphodon paucimaculatus Taylor, 1938
Trimorphodon quadruplex (Smith, 1941)
Mexican lyre snake, Trimorphodon tau
Trimorphodon tau latifascia (Peters, 1869)
Trimorphodon tau tau (Cope, 1870)
Texas lyre snake, Trimorphodon vilkinsonii (Cope, 1886)

References 

CaliforniaHerps.com Trimorphodon biscutatus lyrophanes - Baja California Lyresnake 

Colubrids
Snakes of North America
Vertebrates of Mexico
Snakes of Central America
Snake genera
Taxa named by Edward Drinker Cope